Thomas Lyttelton, 6th Baronet, 2nd Baron Lyttelton (30 January 1744 – 27 November 1779) was an English MP and profligate from the Lyttelton family.

Life
Sometimes dubbed "the wicked Lord Lyttelton" and "bad Lord Lyttelton" to discredit his independence from the political parties and religious dogmas of his era, he was the son of George Lyttelton, 1st Baron Lyttelton and 5th Baronet, and his wife Lucy Fortescue. His mother died when he was two years old. He was talented in his early years, particularly in drawing. Educated at Eton and Christ Church, Oxford where he matriculated in 1761, he was also a reader of poetry, his favourite poet being John Milton. 

His father, the 1st Lord Lyttelton, held political posts including Privy Councillor, a Lord of the Treasury and Chancellor of the Exchequer. He himself was a good friend of the Prince of Wales, who later became King George III. Lyttelton received his pension through his estranged father, and because of his parentage and ability, he also had a career in public life. He was a Whig MP for Bewdley from 1768 to 1769 and the Chief Justice of the Eyre in 1775, and became a Privy Councillor the same year.

His death was widely reported to have been foreseen by himself three days beforehand; he claimed a bird flew into his room, and told him he had only three days to live.

Family
Lyttelton married Aphia Witts, but they had no children, so on his death, his barony became extinct. It was recreated in 1794, however, for his successor in the baronetcy, his father's brother Sir William Lyttelton, 7th Baronet.

References
Burke's Peerage and Baronetage (1939), s.v Cobham, Viscount

Notes

External links
 

Lyttleton, Thomas, 2nd Baron
Lyttleton, Thomas, 2nd Baron
People educated at Eton College
Alumni of Christ Church, Oxford
Members of the Parliament of Great Britain for English constituencies
Whig (British political party) MPs
British MPs 1768–1774
Barons Lyttelton (1756 creation)
Thomas